The U.S. Post Office and Courthouse in Lander, Wyoming was built in 1907 as part of a facilities improvement program by the United States Post Office Department.  The post office in Lander was nominated to the National Register of Historic Places as part of a thematic study comprising twelve Wyoming post offices built to standardized USPO plans in the early twentieth century. Lander's post office is unique among the group because it incorporates court facilities.

The building is now used as offices for a rehabilitation and disabilities advocacy group.

References

External links

 at the National Park Service's NRHP database
Federal District Courthouse, District of Wyoiming at Courthouses of the West

Buildings and structures in Fremont County, Wyoming
Courthouses on the National Register of Historic Places in Wyoming
Federal courthouses in the United States
Government buildings completed in 1907
Post office buildings on the National Register of Historic Places in Wyoming
National Register of Historic Places in Fremont County, Wyoming
Lander, Wyoming